The following is a list of Banksia species accepted by the Australian Plant Census as at March 2020, with the addition of the fossil species B. archaeocarpa, B. kingii, B. longicarpa, B. microphylla, B. novae-zelandiae, B. paleocrypta and B. strahanensis.

 Banksia acanthopoda (A.S.George) A.R.Mast & K.R.Thiele (W.A.)
 Banksia aculeata A.S.George - prickly banksia (W.A.)
 Banksia acuminata A.R.Mast & K.R.Thiele (W.A.)
 Banksia aemula R.Br. - wallum banksia (Qld., N.S.W.)
 Banksia alliacea A.R.Mast & K.R.Thiele (W.A.)
 Banksia anatona (A.S.George) A.R.Mast & K.R.Thiele - cactus dryandra (W.A.)
 Banksia aquilonia (A.S.George) A.S.George - northern banksia, jingana (Qld.)
 Banksia arborea (C.A.Gardner) A.R.Mast & K.R.Thiele – Yilgarn dryandra (W.A.)
 Banksia archaeocarpa McNamara & Scott (fossil)
 Banksia arctotidis (R.Br.) A.R.Mast & K.R.Thiele (W.A.)
 Banksia armata (R.Br.) A.R.Mast & K.R.Thiele - prickly dryandra (W.A.)
 Banksia armata var. armata
 Banksia armata var. ignicida (A.S.George) A.R.Mast & K.R.Thiele
 Banksia ashbyi Baker f. - Ashby's banksia (W.A.)
 Banksia ashbyi subsp. ashbyi
 Banksia ashbyi subsp. boreoscaia A.S.George
 Banksia attenuata R.Br. - candlestick banksia, slender banksia, biara (W.A.)
 Banksia audax C.A.Gardner (W.A.)
 Banksia aurantia (A.S.George) A.R.Mast & K.R.Thiele - orange dryandra (W.A.)
 Banksia baueri R.Br. - woolly banksia (W.A.)
 Banksia baxteri R.Br. - Baxter's banksia, bird's nest banksia (W.A.)
 Banksia bella A.R.Mast & K.R.Thiele - Wongan dryandra (W.A.)
 Banksia benthamiana C.A.Gardner (W.A.)
 Banksia bipinnatifida (R.Br.) A.R.Mast & K.R.Thiele (W.A.)
 Banksia bipinnatifida subsp. bipinnatifida
 Banksia bipinnatifida subsp. multifida (A.S.George) A.R.Mast & K.R.Thiele
 Banksia biterax A.R.Mast & K.R.Thiele (W.A.)
 Banksia blechnifolia F.Muell. (W.A.)
 Banksia borealis (A.S.George) A.R.Mast & K.R.Thiele (W.A.)
 Banksia borealis subsp. borealis
 Banksia borealis subsp. elatior (A.S.George) A.R.Mast & K.R.Thiele
 Banksia brownii Baxter ex R.Br. - Brown's banksia, feather-leaved banksia (W.A.)
 Banksia brunnea A.R.Mast & K.R.Thiele (W.A.)
 Banksia burdettii Baker f. - Burdett's banksia (W.A.)
 Banksia caleyi R.Br. - Cayley's banksia, red lantern banksia (W.A.)
 Banksia calophylla (R.Br.) A.R.Mast & K.R.Thiele (W.A.)
 Banksia candolleana Meisn. - propeller banksia (W.A.)
 Banksia canei J.H.Willis - mountain banksia (N.S.W., Vic)
 Banksia carlinoides (Meisn.) A.R.Mast & K.R.Thiele – pink dryandra (W.A.)
 Banksia catoglypta (A.S.George) A.R.Mast & K.R.Thiele (W.A.)
 Banksia chamaephyton A.S.George - fishbone banksia (W.A.)
 Banksia cirsioides (Meisn.) A.R.Mast & K.R.Thiele (W.A.)
 Banksia coccinea R.Br. - scarlet banksia, waratah banksia, Albany banksia (W.A.)
 Banksia columnaris (A.S.George) A.R.Mast & K.R.Thiele (W.A.)
 Banksia comosa (Meisn.) A.R.Mast & K.R.Thiele (W.A.)
 Banksia concinna (R.Br.) A.R.Mast & K.R.Thiele (W.A.)
 Banksia conferta A.S.George - glasshouse banksia (Qld., N.S.W.)
 Banksia corvijuga (A.S.George) A.R.Mast & K.R.Thiele (W.A.)
 Banksia croajingolensis Molyneux & Forrester – Gippsland banksia (Vic.)
 Banksia cuneata A.S.George - matchstick banksia, Quairading banksia (W.A.)
 Banksia cynaroides (C.A.Gardner) A.R.Mast & K.R.Thiele (W.A.)
 Banksia cypholoba (A.S.George) A.R.Mast & K.R.Thiele (W.A.)
 Banksia dallanneyi A.R.Mast & K.R.Thiele – couch honeypot (W.A.)
 Banksia dallanneyi subsp. agricola (A.S.George) A.R.Mast & K.R.Thiele
 Banksia dallanneyi subsp. dallanneyi
 Banksia dallanneyi var. dallanneyi
 Banksia dallanneyi var. mellicula (A.S.George) A.R.Mast & K.R.Thiele
 Banksia dallanneyi subsp. media (A.S.George) A.R.Mast & K.R.Thiele
 Banksia dallanneyi subsp. pollosta (A.S.George) A.R.Mast & K.R.Thiele
 Banksia dallanneyi subsp. sylvestris (A.S.George) A.R.Mast & K.R.Thiele
 Banksia densa A.R.Mast & K.R.Thiele (W.A.)
 Banksia densa var. densa
 Banksia densa var. parva (A.S.George) A.R.Mast & K.R.Thiele
 Banksia densa var. Wheatbelt
 Banksia dentata L.f. - tropical banksia (W.A., N.T., Qld.)
 Banksia drummondii (Meisn.) A.R.Mast & K.R.Thiele – Drummond's dryandra (W.A.)
 Banksia drummondii subsp. drummondii
 Banksia drummondii subsp. hiemalis (A.S.George) A.R.Mast & K.R.Thiele
 Banksia drummondii subsp. macrorufa (A.S.George) A.R.Mast & K.R.Thiele
 Banksia dryandroides Baxter ex Sweet - dryandra-leaved banksia, manyat (W.A.)
 Banksia echinata (A.S.George) A.R.Mast & K.R.Thiele (W.A.)
 Banksia elderiana F.Muell. & Tate - swordfish banksia (W.A.)
 Banksia elegans Meisn. - elegant banksia (W.A.)
 Banksia epica A.S.George (W.A.)
 Banksia epimicta (A.S.George) A.R.Mast & K.R.Thiele (W.A.)
 Banksia ericifolia L.f. - heath-leaved banksia, lantern banksia (N.S.W.)
 Banksia ericifolia subsp. ericifolia
 Banksia ericifolia subsp. macrantha (A.S.George) A.S.George
 Banksia erythrocephala (C.A.Gardner) A.R.Mast & K.R.Thiele (W.A.)
 Banksia erythrocephala var. erythrocephala
 Banksia erythrocephala var. inopinata (A.S.George) A.R.Mast & K.R.Thiele
 Banksia falcata (R.Br.) A.R.Mast & K.R.Thiele – prickly dryandra (W.A.)
 Banksia fasciculata (A.S.George) A.R.Mast & K.R.Thiele (W.A.)
 Banksia fililoba (A.S.George) A.R.Mast & K.R.Thiele (W.A.)
 Banksia foliolata (R.Br.) A.R.Mast & K.R.Thiele (W.A.)
 Banksia foliosissima (C.A.Gardner) A.R.Mast & K.R.Thiele (W.A.)
 Banksia formosa (R.Br.) A.R.Mast & K.R.Thiele – showy dryandra (W.A.)
 Banksia fraseri (R.Br.) A.R.Mast & K.R.Thiele (W.A.)
 Banksia fraseri var. ashbyi (B.L.Burtt) A.R.Mast & K.R.Thiele
 Banksia fraseri var. crebra (A.S.George) A.R.Mast & K.R.Thiele
 Banksia fraseri var. effusa (A.S.George) A.R.Mast & K.R.Thiele
 Banksia fraseri var. fraseri (A.S.George) A.R.Mast & K.R.Thiele
 Banksia fraseri var. oxycedra (A.S.George) A.R.Mast & K.R.Thiele
 Banksia fuscobractea (A.S.George) A.R.Mast & K.R.Thiele – dark-bract banksia (W.A.)
 Banksia gardneri A.S.George - prostrate banksia (W.A.)
 Banksia gardneri var. brevidentata A.S.George
 Banksia gardneri var. gardneri
 Banksia gardneri var. hiemalis A.S.George
 Banksia glaucifolia A.R.Mast & K.R.Thiele (W.A.)
 Banksia goodii R.Br. - Good's banksia (W.A.)
 Banksia grandis Willd. - bull banksia, giant banksia, beera (W.A.)
 Banksia grossa A.S.George (W.A.)
 Banksia heliantha (A.S.George) A.R.Mast & K.R.Thiele – oak-leaved dryandra (W.A.)
 Banksia hewardiana (Meisn.) A.R.Mast & K.R.Thiele (W.A.)
 Banksia hirta A.R.Mast & K.R.Thiele (W.A.)
 Banksia hookeriana Meisn. - Hooker's banksia (W.A.)
  Banksia horrida (Meisn.) A.R.Mast & K.R.Thiele – prickly dryandra (W.A.)
 Banksia idiogenes (A.S.George) A.R.Mast & K.R.Thiele (W.A.)
 Banksia ilicifolia R.Br. - holly-leaved banksia (W.A.)
 Banksia incana A.S.George - hoary banksia (W.A.)
 Banksia incana var. brachyphylla A.S.George
 Banksia incana var. incana 
 Banksia insulanemorecincta (A.S.George) A.R.Mast & K.R.Thiele (W.A.)
 Banksia integrifolia L.f. - coast banksia, white honeysuckle (Qld., N.S.W., Vic., Tas.)
 Banksia integrifolia subsp. compar (R.Br.) K.R.Thiele
 Banksia integrifolia subsp. integrifolia
 Banksia integrifolia subsp. monticola K.R.Thiele
 Banksia ionthocarpa (A.S.George) A.R.Mast & K.R.Thiele (W.A.)
 Banksia ionthocarpa subsp. chrysophoenix (A.S.George) A.R.Mast & K.R.Thiele
 Banksia ionthocarpa subsp. ionthocarpa 
 Banksia kingii Jordan & Hill (fossil)
 Banksia kippistiana (Meisn.) A.R.Mast & K.R.Thiele (W.A.)
 Banksia kippistiana var. kippistiana
 Banksia kippistiana var. paenepeccata (A.S.George) A.R.Mast & K.R.Thiele
 Banksia laevigata Meisn. - tennis ball banksia (W.A.)
 Banksia laevigata subsp. fuscolutea A.S.George
 Banksia laevigata subsp. laevigata
 Banksia lanata A.S.George - Coomallo banksia (W.A.)
 Banksia laricina C.A.Gardner - rose banksia, rose-fruited banksia (W.A.)
 Banksia lemanniana Meisn. - Lemann's banksia, yellow lantern banksia (W.A.)
 Banksia lepidorhiza (A.S.George) A.R.Mast & K.R.Thiele (W.A.)
 Banksia leptophylla A.S.George - slender leaved banksia (W.A.)
 Banksia leptophylla var. leptophylla
 Banksia leptophylla var. melletica A.S.George
 Banksia lindleyana Meisn. - porcupine banksia (W.A.)
 Banksia littoralis R.Br. - western swamp banksia, swamp banksia  (W.A.)  
 Banksia longicarpa Greenwood, Haines & Steart (fossil)
 Banksia lullfitzii C.A.Gardner  (W.A.)
 Banksia marginata Cav. - silver banksia, warrock  (S.A., N.S.W., A.C.T., Vic., Tas.)
 Banksia media R.Br. - southern plains banksia, golden stalk banksia (W.A.)
 Banksia meganotia (A.S.George) A.R.Mast & K.R.Thiele (W.A.)
 Banksia meisneri Lehm. - Meisner's banksia (W.A.)
 Banksia meisneri subsp. ascendens (A.S.George) A.S.George
 Banksia meisneri subsp. meisneri
 Banksia menziesii R.Br. - Menzies' banksia, firewood banksia (W.A.)
 Banksia micrantha A.S.George (W.A.)
 Banksia microphylla R.J.Carpenter & L.A.Milne
 Banksia mimica (A.S.George) A.R.Mast & K.R.Thiele (W.A.) - summer honeypot
 Banksia montana (C.A.Gardner ex A.S.George) A.R.Mast & K.R.Thiele (W.A.) - Stirling Range dryandra
 Banksia mucronulata (R.Br.) A.R.Mast & K.R.Thiele (W.A.) - swordfish dryandra
 Banksia nana (Meisn.) A.R.Mast & K.R.Thiele (W.A.) - dwarf dryandra
 Banksia neoanglica (A.S.George) Stimpson & J.J.Bruhl (Qld., N.S.W.) - New England banksia
 Banksia nivea Labill. (W.A.) - honeypot dryandra
 Banksia nivea subsp. Morangup
 Banksia nivea subsp. nivea
 Banksia nivea subsp. uliginosa (A.S.George) A.R.Mast & K.R.Thiele
 Banksia nobilis (Lindl.) A.R.Mast & K.R.Thiele  (W.A.)
 Banksia nobilis subsp. fragrans (A.S.George) A.R.Mast & K.R.Thiele
 Banksia nobilis subsp. nobilis
 Banksia novae-zelandiae R.J.Carp., G.J.Jord., D.E.Lee & R.S.Hill (fossil)
 Banksia nutans R.Br. - nodding banksia (W.A.)
 Banksia nutans var. cernuella A.S.George
 Banksia nutans var. nutans
 Banksia oblongifolia Cav. - rusty banksia, dwarf banksia (Qld. N.S.W.)
 Banksia obovata A.R.Mast & K.R.Thiele (W.A.)
 Banksia obtusa (R.Br.) A.R.Mast & K.R.Thiele
 Banksia occidentalis R.Br. - red swamp banksia, water bush banksia (W.A.)
 Banksia octotriginta (A.S.George) A.R.Mast & K.R.Thiele (W.A.)
 Banksia oligantha A.S.George - Wagin banksia (W.A.)
 Banksia oreophila A.S.George - western mountain banksia (W.A.)
 Banksia ornata F.Muell. ex Meisn. - desert banksia (S.A., Vic.)
 Banksia paleocrypta R.J.Carp. (fossil)
 Banksia pallida (A.S.George) A.R.Mast & K.R.Thiele (W.A.)
 Banksia paludosa R.Br. - swamp banksia, marsh banksia (N.S.W.)
 Banksia paludosa subsp. astrolux A.S.George
 Banksia paludosa subsp. paludosa
 Banksia pellaeifolia A.R.Mast & K.R.Thiele (W.A.)
 Banksia penicillata (A.S.George) K.R.Thiele (N.S.W.)
 Banksia petiolaris F.Muell. (W.A.)
 Banksia pilostylis C.A.Gardner (W.A.)
 Banksia plagiocarpa A.S.George - Dallachy's banksia, blue banksia, Hinchinbrook banksia (Qld.)
 Banksia platycarpa (A.S.George) A.R.Mast & K.R.Thiele (W.A.)
 Banksia plumosa (R.Br.) A.R.Mast & K.R.Thiele (W.A.)
 Banksia plumosa subsp. denticulata (A.S.George) A.R.Mast & K.R.Thiele
 Banksia plumosa subsp. plumosa
 Banksia polycephala (Benth.) A.R.Mast & K.R.Thiele (W.A.)
 Banksia porrecta (A.S.George) A.R.Mast & K.R.Thiele (W.A.)
 Banksia praemorsa Andrews - cut-leaf banksia (W.A.)
 Banksia prionophylla A.R.Mast & K.R.Thiele (W.A.)
 Banksia prionotes Lindl. - acorn banksia, orange banksia (W.A.)
 Banksia prolata A.R.Mast & K.R.Thiele (W.A.)
 Banksia prolata subsp. archeos (A.S.George) A.R.Mast & K.R.Thiele
 Banksia prolata subsp. calcicola (A.S.George) A.R.Mast & K.R.Thiele
 Banksia prolata subsp. prolata
 Banksia proteoides (Lindl.) A.R.Mast & K.R.Thiele (W.A.)
 Banksia pseudoplumosa (A.S.George) A.R.Mast & K.R.Thiele (W.A.)
 Banksia pteridifolia (R.Br.) A.R.Mast & K.R.Thiele (W.A.)
 Banksia pteridifolia subsp. inretita (A.S.George) A.R.Mast & K.R.Thiele
 Banksia pteridifolia subsp. pteridifolia
 Banksia pteridifolia subsp. vernalis (A.S.George) A.R.Mast & K.R.Thiele
 Banksia pulchella R.Br. - teasel banksia, dainty banksia (W.A.)
 Banksia purdieana (Diels) A.R.Mast & K.R.Thiele (W.A.)
 Banksia quercifolia R.Br. - oak-leaved banksia (W.A.)
 Banksia recurvistylis K.R.Thiele (W.A.)
 Banksia repens Labill. - creeping banksia (W.A.)
 Banksia robur Cav. - eastern swamp banksia, swamp banksia, broad-leaved banksia (Qld., N.S.W.)
 Banksia rosserae Olde & Marriott (W.A.)
 Banksia rufa A.R.Mast & K.R.Thiele (W.A.)
 Banksia rufa subsp. chelomacarpa (A.S.George) A.R.Mast & K.R.Thiele
 Banksia rufa subsp. flavescens (A.S.George) A.R.Mast & K.R.Thiele
 Banksia rufa subsp. magna (A.S.George) A.R.Mast & K.R.Thiele
 Banksia rufa subsp. obliquiloba (A.S.George) A.R.Mast & K.R.Thiele
 Banksia rufa subsp. pumila (A.S.George) A.R.Mast & K.R.Thiele
 Banksia rufa subsp. rufa
 Banksia rufa subsp. tutanningensis (A.S.George) A.R.Mast & K.R.Thiele
 Banksia rufistylis (A.S.George) A.R.Mast & K.R.Thiele (W.A.)
 Banksia saxicola A.S.George - Grampians banksia, rock banksia (Vic.)
 Banksia scabrella A.S.George - Burma Road banksia (W.A.)
 Banksia sceptrum Meisn. - sceptre banksia (W.A.)
 Banksia sclerophylla (Meisn.) A.R.Mast & K.R.Thiele (W.A.)
 Banksia seminuda (A.S.George) Rye - river banksia (W.A.)
 Banksia seneciifolia (R.Br.) A.R.Mast & K.R.Thiele (W.A.)
 Banksia serra (R.Br.) A.R.Mast & K.R.Thiele (W.A.)
 Banksia serrata L.f. - saw banksia, red honeysuckle, old man banksia (Qld., N.S.W., Vic., Tas.)
 Banksia serratuloides (Meisn.) A.R.Mast & K.R.Thiele (W.A.)
 Banksia serratuloides subsp. perissa (A.S.George) A.R.Mast & K.R.Thiele
 Banksia serratuloides subsp. serratuloides
 Banksia sessilis (Knight) A.R.Mast & K.R.Thiele - parrot bush (W.A.)
 Banksia sessilis var. cordata (Meisn.) A.R.Mast & K.R.Thiele
 Banksia sessilis var. cygnorum (Gand.) A.R.Mast & K.R.Thiele
 Banksia sessilis var. flabellifolia (A.S.George) A.R.Mast & K.R.Thiele
 Banksia sessilis var. sessilis
 Banksia shanklandiorum (Randall) A.R.Mast & K.R.Thiele (W.A.)
 Banksia shuttleworthiana (Meisn.) A.R.Mast & K.R.Thiele (W.A.)
 Banksia solandri R.Br. - Stirling Range banksia, Solander's banksia (W.A.)
 Banksia speciosa R.Br. - showy banksia (W.A.)
 Banksia sphaerocarpa R.Br. - fox banksia, round-fruited banksia (W.A.)
 Banksia sphaerocarpa var. caesia A.S.George
 Banksia sphaerocarpa var. dolichostyla A.S.George
 Banksia sphaerocarpa var. latifolia F.Muell. ex Benth.
 Banksia sphaerocarpa var. pumilio A.S.George
 Banksia sphaerocarpa var. sphaerocarpa
 Banksia spinulosa Sm. - hairpin banksia (Qld., N.S.W., Vic.)
 Banksia spinulosa var. collina (R.Br.) A.S.George
 Banksia spinulosa var. cunninghamii (Sieber ex Rchb. A.S.George
 Banksia spinulosa var. spinulosa
 Banksia splendida A.R.Mast & K.R.Thiele (W.A.)
 Banksia splendida subsp. macrocarpa (A.S.George) A.R.Mast & K.R.Thiele
 Banksia splendida subsp. splendida
 Banksia squarrosa (R.Br.) A.R.Mast & K.R.Thiele (W.A.)
 Banksia squarrosa subsp. argillacea (A.S.George) A.R.Mast & K.R.Thiele
 Banksia squarrosa subsp. squarrosa
 Banksia stenoprion (Meisn.) A.R.Mast & K.R.Thiele (W.A.)
 Banksia strahanensis Jordan & Hill (fossil)
 Banksia strictifolia A.R.Mast & K.R.Thiele (W.A.)
 Banksia stuposa (Lindl.) A.R.Mast & K.R.Thiele (W.A.)
 Banksia subpinnatifida (C.A.Gardner) A.R.Mast & K.R.Thiele (W.A.)
 Banksia subpinnatifida var. imberbis (A.S.George) A.R.Mast & K.R.Thiele
 Banksia subpinnatifida var. subpinnatifida
 Banksia subulata (C.A.Gardner) A.R.Mast & K.R.Thiele (W.A.)
 Banksia telmatiaea A.S.George - swamp fox banksia (W.A.)
 Banksia tenuis A.R.Mast & K.R.Thiele (W.A.)
 Banksia tenuis var. reptans (A.S.George) A.R.Mast & K.R.Thiele
 Banksia tenuis var. tenuis 
 Banksia tortifolia (Kippist ex Meisn.) A.R.Mast & K.R.Thiele (W.A.)
 Banksia tricuspis Meisn. - Lesueur banksia, pine banksia (W.A.)
 Banksia tridentata (Meisn.) B.D.Jacks. (W.A.)
 Banksia trifontinalis (A.S.George) A.R.Mast & K.R.Thiele (W.A.)
 Banksia undata A.R.Mast & K.R.Thiele (W.A.)
 Banksia undata var. splendens (A.S.George) A.R.Mast & K.R.Thiele
 Banksia undata var. undata 
 Banksia verticillata R.Br. - granite banksia, Albany banksia (W.A.)
 Banksia vestita (Kippist ex Meisn.) A.R.Mast & K.R.Thiele (W.A.)
 Banksia victoriae Meisn. - woolly orange banksia (W.A.)
 Banksia vincentia Stimpson & P.H.Weston (N.S.W.)
 Banksia violacea C.A.Gardner - violet banksia (W.A.)
 Banksia viscida (A.S.George) A.R.Mast & K.R.Thiele (W.A.)
 Banksia wonganensis (A.S.George) A.R.Mast & K.R.Thiele (W.A.)
 Banksia xylothemelia (A.S.George) A.R.Mast & K.R.Thiele (W.A.)

See also
Taxonomy of Banksia

References

List
Banksia, List
Banksia